Contracts of Employment (Indigenous Workers) Convention, 1947 (shelved) is  an International Labour Organization Convention.

It was established in 1947 with the preamble stating:
Having decided upon the adoption of certain proposals concerning the maximum length of contracts of employment of indigenous workers,...

Ratifications
Prior to its shelving, this convention was ratified by 26 states.

External links 
Text.
Ratifications.

Shelved International Labour Organization conventions
Treaties concluded in 1947
Treaties entered into force in 1953